The Latin-British Exhibition of 1912 was one of the last exhibitions held in Shepherd's Bush, London, in the exhibition space known as the Great White City, and later simply as White City. The exhibition site is now occupied by the BBC White City centre and the Westfield London shopping centre, one of the largest in Britain.

Among the attractions were the flip flap, a large cable car with views of the city.

See also
History of Shepherd's Bush
White City

References
 green-stuff.co.uk Retrieved November 2011
Latin-British Exhibition, 1912, Great White City, Shepherd's Bush, London: fine art catalogue Retrieved November 2011

Notes

History of the London Borough of Hammersmith and Fulham
1912 in London
World's fairs in London
White City, London
Festivals established in 1912
1912 festivals